The Enceladus Orbilander is a proposed NASA Flagship mission to Saturn's moon Enceladus. The Enceladus Orbilander would spend a year and a half orbiting Enceladus and sampling its water plumes, which stretch into space, before landing on the surface for a two-year mission to study materials for evidence of life. The mission, with an estimated cost of $4.9 billion, could launch in the late 2030s on a Space Launch System or Falcon Heavy with a landing in the early 2050s. It was proposed in the 2023-2032 Planetary Science Decadal Survey as the third highest priority Flagship mission, after the Uranus Orbiter and Probe and the Mars Sample Return program.

References

Proposed NASA space probes
Enceladus